Rotoita basalis is a small parasitic wasp in the relictual family Rotoitidae. It is known only from New Zealand, and its closest known living relative (and only other extant species in the same family) is endemic to Chile (Chiloe micropteron).

Unique anatomy 
Rotoitids are very near to the base of the chalcidoid family tree, close to the Mymaridae. Unusual characteristics of Rotoita include a 14-segmented antennae in the female with a distinct 6-segmented clava (club-like segments at the end of antennae), a basal vein in the fore wing, a transverse scutellum, extremely reduced and hidden prepectus, and absence of notauli.

Specimens are approximately 1mm in length.

Discovery 
The family was established for the new genus and species Rotoita basalis by Zdenek Boucek and John S. Noyes in 1987, based on three fully winged females from New Zealand. The authors stated that they also had two other females from the North and South Islands of New Zealand that might represent two additional species.

Biology 
Nothing is actually known about Rotoita biology.

Etymology 
A slide-mounted female from St. Arnaud (formally Rotoiti Village) is listed as a paratype used to describe the species. Lake Rotoiti is a large fresh water body and a dominant feature when visiting Saint Arnaud Village: it was inspiration when naming the genus. The Maori name "Rotoiti" translates simply as "Little Lake".

References

Insects described in 1987
Chalcidoidea
Hymenoptera of New Zealand